The 2017 GFW Super X Cup Tournament is a professional wrestling single-elimination X Cup Tournament produced by the Global Force Wrestling promotion. It is the first Super X Cup to be held since 2005, however in 2006 and 2008 TNA held team based World X Cup Tournaments. The tournament features eight wrestlers: Dezmond Xavier, Davey Richards and Andrew Everett representing Global Force Wrestling; with Idris Abraham representing GFW and the Can-Am Wrestling School, A. C. H. representing AAW, Drago representing Lucha Libre AAA Worldwide, Sammy Guevara representing Wrestle Circus and Taiji Ishimori representing Pro Wrestling Noah.

The tournament final took place at Destination X special episode of Impact! on August 17, 2017, in which Dezmond Xavier defeated Taiji Ishimori to win the tournament. The winner would receive an X Division Championship title shot.

Background
The 2017 Impact Wrestling Super X Cup Tournament is a professional wrestling single-elimination X Cup Tournament produced by the Impact Wrestling promotion. It is the first Super X Cup to be held since 2005, however in 2006 and 2008 TNA held team based World X Cup Tournaments. The tournament features eight wrestlers: Dezmond Xavier, Davey Richards and Andrew Everett representing Global Force Wrestling; with Idris Abraham representing GFW and the Can-Am Wrestling School, ACH representing All American Wrestling, Drago representing Lucha Libre AAA Worldwide, Sammy Guevara representing Wrestle Circus and Taiji Ishimori representing Pro Wrestling Noah.

Tournament bracket

Source:

References

External links
Impact Wrestling.com

Impact Wrestling tournaments
2017 in professional wrestling